Vera White (1893 - 1949) was an Australian actress primarily in silent films.

Born in Melbourne, perhaps her most accessible performance today is as "Kay's Friend" in the 1928 Laurel and Hardy silent short subject We Faw Down. She delivers to Stan the pie that prevents Ollie from being stabbed by pugilist "One Round" Kelly; later, it's her delivery of Ollie's vest to his front door — and her coy fondism "Big Boy" — that provokes Mrs. Hardy's shotgun-wielding rampage that ends the picture.

Filmography

Swiss Miss (1938) — extra (uncredited)
We Faw Down (1928) as Kay's Friend  (aka We Slip Up (UK))
The Cockeyed Family (1928) as Mrs. Beamish
Is Your Daughter Safe? (1927) as Lady of Leisure
Wide Open Spaces (1924) — (uncredited)  (aka Wild Bill Hiccup (USA))
Hustlin' Hank (1923)
Where Am I? (1923)
Friday, the Thirteenth (1922/II)
Many Happy Returns (1922)
Light Showers (1922)
The Pickaninny (1921)
Fifteen Minutes (1921)
Late Hours (1921)
Trolley Troubles (1921)
Never Weaken (1921) — (uncredited)
Sweet By and By (1921)
I Do (1921) — (uncredited)
On Their Way (1921)
Stop Kidding (1921)
Among Those Present (1921) as Society Pilot

References

Further reading

 Nick Murphy (5 November 2021), Vera White (1893-1956) Life in Hollywood's golden age, Forgotten Australian Actors website.

External links
 

Australian silent film actresses
20th-century Australian actresses
Actresses from Melbourne
1893 births
1949 deaths
19th-century Australian women